Ambrysus is a genus of creeping water bugs in the family Naucoridae. There are more than 90 described species in Ambrysus.

Species
These 96 species belong to the genus Ambrysus:

 Ambrysus abortus La Rivers, 1953
 Ambrysus acutangulus Montandon, 1897
 Ambrysus amargosus La Rivers, 1953
 Ambrysus arizonus La Rivers, 1951
 Ambrysus attenuatus Montandon, 1897
 Ambrysus ayoyolin Reynoso & Sites, 2016-22
 Ambrysus baeus J.Polhemus & D.Polhemus, 1981-01
 Ambrysus bergi Montandon, 1897
 Ambrysus bifidus La Rivers & Nieser, 1972
 Ambrysus bispinus La Rivers, 1953
 Ambrysus bowlesi Reynoso & Sites, 2016-22
 Ambrysus brunneus Sites, 2015-23
 Ambrysus buenoi Usinger, 1946
 Ambrysus californicus Montandon, 1897
 Ambrysus calilegua López Ruf, 2007-01
 Ambrysus cayo Sites & Shepard, 2015-01
 Ambrysus chiapanecus Reynoso, Sites & Novelo, 2016-16
 Ambrysus circumcinctus Montandon, 1910
 Ambrysus colimanus J.Polhemus & D.Polhemus, 1981-01
 Ambrysus colombicus Montandon, 1909
 Ambrysus compressicollis Usinger
 Ambrysus contrerasi Reynoso & Sites, 2016-22
 Ambrysus convexus Usinger, 1946-01
 Ambrysus cosmius La Rivers, 1953
 Ambrysus crenulatus Montandon, 1897
 Ambrysus drakei La Rivers, 1957
 Ambrysus dyticus
 Ambrysus fittkaui De Carlo, 1956
 Ambrysus fossatus Usinger, 1946-01
 Ambrysus fraternus Montandon, 1897
 Ambrysus fucatus Berg, 1879
 Ambrysus funebris La Rivers, 1949
 Ambrysus fuscus Usinger, 1946-01
 Ambrysus geayi Montandon, 1897-01
 Ambrysus gemignanii De Carlo, 1950
 Ambrysus guttatipennis Stål, 1876
 Ambrysus harmodius La Rivers, 1962
 Ambrysus horvathi Montandon, 1909
 Ambrysus hungerfordi Usinger, 1946
 Ambrysus hybridus Montandon, 1897
 Ambrysus hydor La Rivers, 1953
 Ambrysus inflatus La Rivers, 1953
 Ambrysus infrageneric Ambrysus Wichi López Ruf
 Ambrysus itsipatsari Reynoso & Sites, 2016-22
 Ambrysus kolla López Ruf, 2004-01
 Ambrysus lamprus Nieser, Pelli & Melo, 1999-23
 Ambrysus lariversi Reynoso & Sites, 2016-19
 Ambrysus lattini La Rivers, 1976-01
 Ambrysus lunatus Usinger, 1946
 Ambrysus lundbladi Usinger, 1946-01
 Ambrysus magniceps La Rivers, 1953
 Ambrysus maldonadus La Rivers, 1954
 Ambrysus maya Sites & Reynoso, 2015-15
 Ambrysus melanopterus Stal, 1862
 Ambrysus mexicanus Montandon, 1897
 Ambrysus montandoni La Rivers, 1963
 Ambrysus mormon Montandon, 1909 (creeping water bug)
 Ambrysus noveloi Reynoso & Sites, 2016-22
 Ambrysus oblongulus Montandon, 1897
 Ambrysus obscuratus Montandon, 1898
 Ambrysus occidentalis La Rivers, 1951
 Ambrysus ochraceus Montandon, 1909
 Ambrysus partridgei De Carlo, 1968
 Ambrysus parviceps Montandon, 1897
 Ambrysus peruvianus Montandon, 1909
 Ambrysus planus La Rivers, 1951
 Ambrysus plautus J.Polhemus & D.Polhemus, 1983
 Ambrysus portheo La Rivers, 1953
 Ambrysus pudicus Stal, 1862
 Ambrysus pulchellus Montandon, 1897
 Ambrysus puncticollis Stål, 1876
 Ambrysus pygmaeus La Rivers, 1953
 Ambrysus quadracies La Rivers, 1976-01
 Ambrysus relictus Polhemus & Polhemus, 1994
 Ambrysus rotundus La Rivers, 1962
 Ambrysus scalenus La Rivers, 1953
 Ambrysus scolius La Rivers, 1970
 Ambrysus shorti Sites, 2015-23
 Ambrysus signoreti Stal, 1862
 Ambrysus siolii De Carlo, 1966
 Ambrysus sonorensis Usinger, 1946-01
 Ambrysus spiculus J.Polhemus & D.Polhemus, 1981-01
 Ambrysus stali La Rivers, 1962
 Ambrysus teutonius La Rivers, 1951
 Ambrysus thermarum La Rivers, 1953
 Ambrysus totonacus Reynoso, Sites & Novelo, 2016-16
 Ambrysus tricuspis La Rivers, 1974-15
 Ambrysus truncaticollis (De Carlo, 1935)
 Ambrysus ultimus La Rivers, 1976-01
 Ambrysus usingeri La Rivers, 1952
 Ambrysus vanduzeei Usinger, 1946-01
 Ambrysus variegatus Usinger, 1946-01
 Ambrysus veracruzanus Reynoso & Sites, 2016-22
 Ambrysus wichi López Ruf, 2013-01
 Ambrysus woodburyi Usinger, 1946
 Ambrysus xico Reynoso, Sites & Novelo, 2016-16

References

Further reading

External links

 

Naucoridae
Nepomorpha genera
Articles created by Qbugbot